Bijalpura or Bijalpura is a neighborhood or a Tol (Nepali:टोल) in Bardibas city. It was a village development committee in Mahottari District before 2015. In 2015, when Government of Nepal decided to dissolve the old thousands of VDCs and declare new 753 local level body then this VDC merged with Bardibas. Bijalpura is located at ward No. 12 and 13 of Bardibas municipality

References

External links
UN map of the municipalities of Mahottari District

Populated places in Mahottari District